Swift Trail Junction is a census-designated place (CDP) in Graham County, Arizona, United States. The population was 2,935 at the 2010 census, up from 2,195 in 2000. It is part of the Safford Micropolitan Statistical Area.

Geography
Swift Trail Junction is located in south-central Graham County at  (32.734604, -109.714970) at the base of the Pinaleno Mountains. It is bordered to the north by the Cactus Flats CDP. The junction at the center of the CDP is between U.S. Route 191, which leads north  to Safford, the county seat, and south  to Interstate 10, and Arizona State Route 366, which leads southwest  up into the heart of the Pinaleno Mountains.

Federal Correctional Institution, Safford, a low-security federal prison for male inmates, is located in the southwest corner of the CDP.

Demographics

As of the census of 2000, there were 2,195 people, 499 households, and 349 families residing in the CDP. The racial makeup of the CDP was 77.7% White, 5.8% Black or African American, 6.1% Native American, 2.2% Asian, 0.1% Pacific Islander, 7.2% from other races, and 1.0% from two or more races.  28.4% of the population were Hispanic or Latino of any race.

There were 499 households, out of which 33.9% had children under the age of 18 living with them, 56.9% were married couples living together, 8.8% had a female householder with no husband present, and 29.9% were non-families. 24.6% of all households were made up of individuals, and 9.4% had someone living alone who was 65 years of age or older.  The average household size was 2.56 and the average family size was 3.07.

In the CDP, the population was spread out, with 16.1% under the age of 18, 10.2% from 18 to 24, 43.6% from 25 to 44, 20.7% from 45 to 64, and 9.3% who were 65 years of age or older.  The median age was 35 years. For every 100 females, there were 236.1 males.  For every 100 females age 18 and over, there were 285.4 males.

The median income for a household in the CDP was $28,393, and the median income for a family was $29,762. Males had a median income of $14,901 versus $18,750 for females. The per capita income for the CDP was $11,731.  About 10.4% of families and 13.8% of the population were below the poverty line, including 7.4% of those under age 18 and 22.5% of those age 65 or over.

References

Census-designated places in Graham County, Arizona
Safford, Arizona micropolitan area